The 2021 European Canoe Slalom Championships took place from 6 to 9 May 2021 in Ivrea, Italy under the auspices of the European Canoe Association (ECA). It was the 22nd edition of the competition. Ivrea hosted the event for the first time. The extreme canoe slalom events made their debut at the European Championships (formerly known as Extreme K1).

This event also served as the European qualification for the postponed 2020 Summer Olympics in Tokyo.

Medal summary

Men

Canoe

Kayak

Women

Canoe

Kayak

Medals Table

References

External links
 European Canoe Association

European Canoe Slalom Championships
European Canoe Slalom Championships
European Canoe Slalom Championships
European Canoe Slalom Championships
Canoeing in Italy
Ivrea